Qarah Bolagh (also Romanized as Qarah Bolāgh and Qareh Bolāgh; also known as Kara-Bulag, Qarabulāq, and Qareh Būlāgh) is a village in Kaghazkonan-e Shomali Rural District of Kaghazkonan District, Mianeh County, East Azerbaijan province, Iran. At the 2006 National Census, its population was 471 in 141 households. The following census in 2011 counted 366 people in 121 households. The latest census in 2016 showed a population of 865 people in 272 households; it was the largest village in its rural district.

References 

Meyaneh County

Populated places in East Azerbaijan Province

Populated places in Meyaneh County